Bud McCartney was the lead on the Granite Curling Club curling team (from Seattle, Washington, United States) during the Curling World Championships known as the 1961 Scotch Cup, where United States team won bronze medal.

References

External links

Possibly living people
American male curlers
Year of birth missing
Place of birth missing
American curling champions